Phew may refer to:

Phew (singer), a Japanese vocalist
 Phew (album), the self-titled debut album
 Phew!, a 1973 solo album by Claudia Lennear
King Phew, a character from The Illmoor Chronicles series of children's fantasy novels

See also
Whew (disambiguation)
PU (disambiguation)